The 1999–2000 World Sevens Series was the first season of the global circuit for men's national rugby sevens teams, organised by the International Rugby Board (now known as World Rugby). The series ran from December 1999 to May 2000 and incorporated ten tournaments spread over five continents. New Zealand was the series champion, winning five of the tournament events. Fiji finished as runner-up, eight points behind despite winning the remaining five tournaments. The leading try-scorer for the  inaugural season was Fiji's Vilimoni Delasau, who notched 83 tries over the series.

Schedule
The official schedule of ten events was announced by the International Rugby Board (IRB) on 2 December 1999. Prominent existing sevens tournaments were included in the new series, for the most part. The New Zealand and South Africa tournaments, however, were hosted as full international sevens events by their respective unions for the first time. An eleventh tournament, to be held in England, was considered but this did not come to fruition and was left off the calendar.

The prestige of the Hong Kong Sevens was acknowledged by increasing the points scale awarded to teams at the tournament by an extra 50 per cent. This recognised the special status of the event organized by the Hong Kong Rugby Union, played over three days instead of two and incorporating 24 teams instead of the usual 16. The union had initially wanted the Hong Kong tournament to be the final stop of the tour, but this proposal had been rejected earlier by the IRB.

Final standings
The points awarded to teams at each event, as well as the overall season totals, are shown in the table below. Points for the event winners are indicated in bold. A zero (0) is recorded in the event column where a team played in a tournament but did not gain any points, however excludes teams that did not accumulate any points overall. A dash (—) is recorded in the event column if a team did not compete at a tournament.

Source: World Rugby (archived) 

Notes:

Tournaments

Dubai

The opening tournament of the brand new series saw the teams head over to Dubai with the three day event starting on the Wednesday with the international tournament being played on the Thursday and Friday. In the cup final, it was New Zealand that took out the cup final defeating Fiji by 24 points with Australia and Scotland taking out the plate and bowl respectively.

South Africa

Punta del Este

Mar del Plata

Wellington

Fiji

Australia

Hong Kong

Japan

France

References

Sources

External links

 
World Rugby Sevens Series